In enzymology, a peptidyl-glutaminase is an enzyme that catalyzes the chemical reaction

alpha-N-peptidyl-L-glutamine + H2O  alpha-N-peptidyl-L-glutamate + NH3

Thus, the two substrates of this enzyme are alpha-N-peptidyl-L-glutamine and H2O, whereas its two products are alpha-N-peptidyl-L-glutamate and NH3.

This enzyme belongs to the family of hydrolases, those acting on carbon-nitrogen bonds other than peptide bonds, specifically in linear amides.  The systematic name of this enzyme class is peptidyl-L-glutamine amidohydrolase. Other names in common use include peptidoglutaminase I, peptideglutaminase, and peptidoglutaminase.

References

 

EC 3.5.1
Enzymes of unknown structure